The 1st Jersey Road Race was a Formula One motor race held on 8 May 1947 at the St. Helier Circuit in Saint Helier, Jersey. The 50-lap race was won by Reg Parnell in a Maserati 4CL. Louis Chiron finished second in another 4CL and Raymond Mays was third in an ERA D-Type. B. Bira started from pole position in a Maserati 4C but retired with engine problems. Raymond Sommer, also in a Maserati, set fastest lap but also retired.

Results

References

Jersey Road Race
Sport in Jersey
Saint Helier